Ynares may refer to:

Places in the Philippines
 Casimiro A. Ynares Sr, Memorial National High School, a public high school in Rizal
 Don Jose M. Ynares Sr. Memorial National High School, a public high school in Rizal
 Ynares Center, an indoor arena in Rizal
 Ynares Sports Arena, an indoor arena in Metro Manila

People with the surname Ynares
 Casimiro "Jun" Ynares III (born 1973), mayor of Antipolo, and former governor of Rizal
 Consuelo Ynares-Santiago (born 1939), former associate justice of the Supreme Court of the Philippines
 Nina Ynares (born 1970), governor of Rizal
 Rebecca Ynares (born 1949), former governor of Rizal

See also